Adrienn Hegedűs (born 26 December 1977) is a Hungarian former tennis player. In her career, she won a total of 18 titles on the ITF Women's Circuit. On 24 September 2001, she reached her career-high singles ranking of world No. 178.

In April 1998, Hegedűs played two doubles rubbers for the Hungary Fed Cup team.

ITF Circuit finals

Singles: 13 (11 titles, 2 runner-ups)

Doubles: 18 (7 titles, 11 runner-ups)

Fed Cup participation

Doubles

External links
 
 
 

1977 births
Living people
Hungarian female tennis players
Sportspeople from Budapest